North Branch Correctional Institution (NBCI) is a high-tech, maximum security prison or "hyper-max prison" operated by the Maryland Department of Public Safety and Correctional Services in Cresaptown, unincorporated Allegany County, Maryland, near Cumberland.

Background
NBCI initially opened in January 2003 as an extension of the earlier adjacent Western Correctional Institution, with full independent operation beginning in the summer 2008 with the completion of housing unit construction. Final construction costs amounted to more than $175 million. In 2011, operating costs totaled $50,613,215 for 1,471 inmates, equating to approximately $34,407 per inmate per year. With 555 employees as of 2011, NBCI is the eighth-largest employer in Allegany County.

Security and safety
Since the closure of the Maryland House of Correction in Jessup, Maryland in 2007 NBCI has housed the most serious offenders within the state of Maryland, including death row inmates (before the death penalty sentences were commuted to LWOP following Maryland's abolition of the death penalty). At the time of its construction, the NBCI was one of the most technologically advanced prisons in the world, and was the first of its kind in the United States.

The prison was constructed using an "inverted fortress" style of building placement, with a master control tower sitting in the middle of a complex that is ringed with housing units and support structures. The control tower is designed for maximum oversight with minimal staffing, requiring only two officers to maintain the entire security system.  It has an unobstructed view of the entire grounds, as well as a complete surveillance of every area accessed by inmates. Additionally, the tower has control over all security doors, cameras, and even the flow of water into individual cells. Instead of one large cell block, the prison features separate housing blocks all zoned and protected so the movement of inmates is eased, reducing the risk of riots and violence.

Four units of 256 cells house the inmate population.  Each cell is just over 60 square feet and is constructed of cast concrete that prevents seams in construction in which to hide contraband. Cell door windows are made of ballistic-resistant glass to allow easier observation and enhance officer safety. The cell's furnishings are relatively minimal. The beds are bolted directly into the concrete and the bolts are rounded down so the inmates cannot remove them to use the beds to ram the doors. The toilets and sinks are brushed stainless steel instead of porcelain to avoid porcelain shards being broken off and being made into weapons. The piping behind the fixtures is also reinforced so if an inmate were to remove the fixture, they cannot escape, and even if they could successfully tunnel through they would end up in the plumbing box which has a similar cell door. The cell doors are by far the most evolved feature of the prison as opposed to the classic cell bar doors. The doors feature micro-perforations to allow corrections officers to speak with inmates and vice versa. The cell doors also have small slots that can be opened to provide meals to inmates perceived to be too dangerous to be let out to the dining area; and to handcuff the inmates before exiting providing corrections officers maximum control over inmate movement. The door frames are filled with concrete to prevent tampering. The walls of the cells are coated with a high grade epoxy paint resistant to scratching, chipping, and even acid. The perimeter consists of fifteen miles of inwardly curved razor wire and motion sensors, as well as regular patrols and fence inspections.  Trained dogs are used to find illicit materials, including cell phones.

Notable incidents
In March 2008, several inmates were injured in what was deemed excessive use of force at the NBCI. These inmates had allegedly been assaulted by North Branch staff shortly after transfer to the facility from nearby Roxbury Correctional Institution after being uncooperative and violent towards RCI officers. This incident led to six NBCI officers being fired and assault charges being filed.

Several homicides have occurred since operations began. On February 10, 2013, an inmate was found dead in his cell in what was described as an apparent homicide. An inmate's death in January at a Baltimore hospital was ruled a homicide. The inmate had been assaulted by another inmate at NBCI the previous November. An inmate was found dead in his cell on September 27, 2012, after an apparent strangulation. This led to the indictment of his cellmate on murder charges in January 2013. On December 8, 2011, an inmate was found unresponsive in his cell. His death was ruled a homicide by strangulation.

On Monday May 8, 2013, an inmate stabbed a correctional officer several times in the head, neck and upper torso at around 8:40am. Officials with the Maryland Department of Public Safety and Correctional Services said the officer, who is in his 30s and a four-year DPSCS veteran, was taken by ambulance to Western Maryland Regional Medical Center with non-life threatening injuries.

Notable inmates

Current
 Anthony Grandison – drug dealer and murderer – formerly on death row.
 Vernon Lee Evans – contract killer convicted of murdering two witnesses in 1983 – formerly on death row.
 Jarrod Warren Ramos - perpetrator of the 2018 Capital Gazette shooting.
 Eulalio Tordil – Homeland Security officer who killed three people and wounded three others in a 24-hour span in 2016.
 Alexander Wayne Watson – serial killer convicted of four murders between 1986 and 1994.

Former
 Adnan Masud Syed – convicted of murder in the January 1999 killing of Hae Min Lee, released in September 2022 after the conviction was overturned.

In popular culture
NBCI has been featured on the television programs MegaStructures, Big, Bigger, Biggest, and Lockdown.

References

External links

 North Branch Correctional Institution
 Budget 2003 details on NBCI

Government buildings completed in 2003
Buildings and structures in Allegany County, Maryland
Capital punishment in Maryland
Prisons in Maryland
2003 establishments in Maryland